Sir Cassam Ismaël Moollan, QC (26 February 1927 – 15 November 2010) was the acting governor-general of Mauritius from 15 December 1985 until 17 January 1986. As chief justice of Mauritius at the time, he assumed the position immediately after the death of Sir Seewoosagur Ramgoolam until a successor could be appointed. He was knighted in 1982.

Early life 

He was educated at the London School of Economics and Political Science (LSE) and earned his LLB in 1950. He was called to the Bar at Lincoln's Inn the following year. Returning to Mauritius, he practised as a lawyer from 1951 to 1955. He was a Magistrate (1955–58), Crown Counsel (1958–64), and Senior Crown Counsel (1964–66). 

He was elevated to Solicitor General in 1966. In 1969, a year before his appointment as Puisne Judge, the Supreme Court, he was made Queen's Counsel (QC). He became Senior Puisne Judge in 1978, editor of the Mauritius Law Report from 1982 to 1984. He became Chief Justice in 1982, a position he held until his retirement in 1988.

He was knighted by the Queen in 1982 and awarded the Chevalier de la Légion d'honneur from France in 1986.

References

External links
Tribute to the Memory of Sir Cassam Ismael Moollan

Alumni of the London School of Economics
Mauritian people of Indian descent
Chevaliers of the Légion d'honneur
Governors-General of Mauritius
Knights Bachelor
Members of Lincoln's Inn
20th-century King's Counsel
1927 births
2010 deaths
Place of death missing
20th-century Mauritian judges
Mauritian Knights Bachelor
Chief justices of Mauritius
Mauritian Queen's Counsel